Gwendolen Mary John (22 June 1876 – 18 September 1939) was a Welsh artist who worked in France for most of her career. Her paintings, mainly portraits of anonymous female sitters, are rendered in a range of closely related tones. Although she was overshadowed during her lifetime by her brother Augustus John and her lover Auguste Rodin, her reputation has grown steadily since her death.

Early life 

Gwen John was born in Haverfordwest, Wales, the second of four children of Edwin William John and his wife Augusta (née Smith). Gwen's elder brother was Thornton John; her younger siblings were Augustus and Winifred. Edwin John was a solicitor whose dour temperament cast a chill over his family, and Augusta was often absent from the children owing to ill health, leaving her two sisters—stern Salvationists—to take her place in the household. Augusta was an amateur watercolourist, and both parents encouraged the children's interest in literature and art. 

Her mother died when Gwen was eight years of age. Regarding her mother's death and the loss of her influence, her brother Augustus later wrote: "My mother would no doubt have been helpful, but she died when I was a small child, after, I fear, a very tearful existence."

Following their mother's premature death in 1884, the family moved to Tenby in Pembrokeshire, Wales, where the early education of Gwen and her sister Winifred was provided by governesses. The siblings often went to the coast of Tenby to sketch. John said that she would make "rapid drawings of beached gulls, shells and fish on stray pieces of paper, or sometimes in the frontispiece of the book she was reading." Although she painted and drew from an early age, Gwen John's earliest surviving work dates from her nineteenth year.

Education
From 1895 to 1898, she studied at the Slade School of Art, where the program was modeled after the French atelier method (various levels of student working under a master artist). It was the only art school in the United Kingdom that allowed female students, although there was generally no mixing of men and women on the grounds, in classes, or in corridors. Like her younger brother, Augustus, who had begun his studies there in 1894, she studied figure drawing under Henry Tonks. During this period, she and Augustus shared living quarters, and further reduced their expenses by subsisting on a diet of nuts and fruit. She developed a close relationship with the woman who would become her brother's wife, Ida Nettleship. At this time, she also had a relationship with another of her brother's friends, Arthur Ambrose McEvoy, which turned out to be an unhappy one. Good friends also included Ursula Tyrwhitt and Gwen Salmond. John won the Melvill Nettleship Prize for Figure Composition in her final year at Slade.

Slade students were encouraged to copy the works of old masters in London museums. John's early paintings such as Portrait of Mrs. Atkinson, Young Woman with a Violin, and Interior with Figures are intimist works painted in a traditional style characterised by subdued colour and transparent glazes.

Even as a student, Augustus's brilliant draughtsmanship and personal glamour made him a celebrity, and stood in contrast to Gwen's quieter gifts and reticent demeanour. Augustus greatly admired his sister's work but believed she neglected her health, and he urged her to take a "more athletic attitude to life". She refused his advice, and  demonstrated throughout her life a marked disregard for her physical well-being.

In 1898 she made her first visit to Paris with two friends from the Slade, and while there she studied under James McNeill Whistler at his school, Académie Carmen. She returned to London in 1899 and exhibited her work for the first time in 1900, at the New English Art Club (NEAC). With Arthur Ambrose McEvoy becoming engaged to Mary Edwards at the end of 1900, "an awkward period ensued with Gwen living at the McEvoy family home in Bayswater", where "she had continued living", "while Ambrose and Mary moved down to Shrivenham in Oxfordshire" c. 1903

France and early career
In late 1903, she travelled to France with her friend Dorelia McNeill (who would later become Augustus John's second wife and whose daughter, Vivien John, would also become an artist). Upon landing in Bordeaux, they set off on a walking tour with their art equipment in hand, intending to reach Rome. Sleeping in fields and living on money earned along the way by selling portrait sketches, they made it as far as Toulouse. 

In 1904, the two went to Paris, where John found work as an artist's model, mostly for women artists. In that same year, she began modelling for the sculptor Auguste Rodin, and became his lover after being introduced by Hilda Flodin. Rodin used John as a model for a muse in his unfinished monument to Whistler. Her devotion to 35-years older Rodin, who was the most famous artist of his time, continued unabated for the next ten years, as documented in her thousands of fervent letters to him. John was given to fierce attachments to both men and women that were sometimes disturbing to them, and Rodin, despite his genuine feeling for her, eventually resorted to the use of concièrges and secretaries to keep her at a distance.

During her years in Paris she met many of the leading artistic personalities of her time, including Matisse, Picasso, Brâncuși, and Rainer Maria Rilke, but the new developments in the art of her time had little effect on her, and she worked in solitude. In 1910 she found living quarters in Meudon, a suburb of Paris where she would remain for the rest of her life. As her affair with Rodin drew to a close, John sought comfort in Catholicism, and around 1913 she was received into the Church. Her notebooks of the period include meditations and prayers; she wrote of her desire to be "God's little artist" and to "become a saint." In an often-quoted letter of ca. 1912, she wrote: "As to whether I have anything worth expressing that is apart from the question. I may never have anything to express, except this desire for a more interior life".

Career

She stopped exhibiting at the NEAC in 1911, but gained an important patron in John Quinn, an American art collector who, from 1910 until his death in 1924, purchased the majority of the works that Gwen John sold. Quinn's support freed John from having to work as a model, and enabled her to devote herself to her work. Although she participated in exhibitions fairly regularly, her perfectionism produced in her a marked ambivalence toward exhibiting. She wrote in 1911: "I paint a good deal, but I don't often get a picture done—that requires, for me, a very long time of a quiet mind, and never to think of exhibitions." In 1913, one of her paintings was included in the seminal Armory Show in New York, which Quinn assisted in organising.

Her attitude toward her work was both self-effacing and confident. After viewing an exhibition of watercolours by Cézanne she remarked: "These are very good, but I prefer my own."

About 1913, as an obligation to the Dominican Sisters of Charity at Meudon, she began a series of painted portraits of Mère Marie Poussepin (1653–1744), the founder of their order. These paintings, based on a prayer card, established a format—the female figure in three-quarter length seated pose—which became characteristic of her mature style. She painted numerous variants on such subjects as Young Woman in a Spotted Blue Dress, Girl Holding a Cat, and The Convalescent. The identities of most of her models are unknown.

In Meudon John lived in solitude, except for her cats. In an undated letter she wrote, "I should like to go and live somewhere where I met nobody I know till I am so strong that people and things could not effect me beyond reason." She wished also to avoid family ties ("I think the family has had its day. We don't go to Heaven in families now but one by one") and her decision to live in France after 1903 may have been the result of her desire to escape the overpowering personality of her famous brother, although, according to art historian David Fraser Jenkins, "there were few occasions when she did anything against her will, and she was the more ruthless and dominating of the two."

John exhibited in Paris for the first time in 1919 at the Salon d'Automne, and exhibited regularly until the mid-1920s, after which time she became increasingly reclusive and painted less. She had only one solo exhibition in her lifetime, at the New Chenil Galleries in London in 1926. In that same year she purchased a bungalow in Meudon. In December 1926, distraught after the death of her old friend Rilke, she met and sought religious guidance from her neighbor,  the neo-Thomist philosopher Jacques Maritain. She also met Maritain's sister-in-law, Véra Oumançoff,  with whom she formed her last romantic relationship, which lasted until 1930.

John's last dated work is a drawing of 20 March 1933, and no evidence suggests that she drew or painted during the remainder of her life. On 10 September 1939, she wrote her will and then travelled to Dieppe, where she collapsed and was hospitalized. She died there on 18 September 1939 and was buried in Janval Cemetery. According to Paul Johnson in Art: A New History, "she appears to have starved to death'".

Art 

In 1916, John wrote in a letter: "I think a picture ought to be done in 1 sitting or at most 2. For that one must paint a lot of canvases probably and waste them." Her surviving oeuvre is comparatively small, comprising 158 known oil paintings which rarely exceed 24 inches in height or width. The majority are portraits, but she also painted still lifes, interiors and a few landscapes. She wrote, "...a cat or a man, its the same thing ... its an affair of volumes ... the object is of no importance." Although she lived in France from the age of 28 until she died, her work always displayed a British sensibility.

Her early paintings, such as the Portrait of the Artist's Sister Winifred (ca. 1897–98) and Dorelia in a Black Dress (1903–04), are painted using thin glazes in the traditional manner of the old masters. Beginning with her series of paintings of Mère Poussepin (ca. 1913), her style is characterised by thicker paint applied in small, mosaic-like touches. It became her habit to paint the same subject repeatedly. Her portraits are usually of anonymous female sitters seated in a three-quarter length format, with their hands in their laps. One of her models, Jeanne Foster, wrote of John: "She takes down my hair and does it like her own ... she has me sit as she does, and I feel the absorption of her personality as I sit".

John's drawings number in the thousands. In addition to studio work, she made many sketches and watercolours of women and children in church. Unlike her oil paintings of solitary women, these sketches frequently depict their subjects from behind, and in groups. She also made many sketches of her cats. Aside from two etchings she drew in 1910, she made no prints.

Her notebooks and letters contain numerous personal formulae for observing  nature, painting a portrait, designating colors by a system of numbers, and the like. Their meaning is often obscure, but they reveal John's predilection for order and the lasting influence of Whistler, whose teaching emphasised systematic preparation.

Gwen John's art, in its quietude and its subtle colour relationships, stands in contrast to her brother's far more vivid and assertive work. Though she was once overshadowed by her popular brother, critical opinion now tends to view Gwen as the more talented of the two.  Augustus himself had predicted this reversal, saying "In 50 years' time I will be known as the brother of Gwen John."

Sexuality
Throughout her life John was attracted to people of both sexes. As a student she had an affair with fellow artist Ambrose McEvoy. Although Auguste Rodin was her great love, she had a number of same-sex relationships. While at Slade she developed a passion for an unnamed woman, which her brother Augustus describes in his autobiography Chiaroscuro; and while walking to Paris with Dorelia McNeill, she developed a passion for a married girl, who then followed them to Paris. It has been suggested that John had romantic feelings for McNeill. Rodin, who had a sexual relationship with his assistant Hilda Flodin, drew erotic drawings of Flodin and John together. The German painter Ida Gerhardi fell in love with John but it was not reciprocated. John's last passion was Véra Oumançoff, for whom she developed an obsession, much to the discomfort of Véra.

Legacy 
John's pictures are held in many public collections. Some of the best examples are in the National Museum Cardiff and in Tate Britain, London.

Still Lives, by Candida Cave, is a three-woman play about Gwen, Ida (Augustus John's wife) and Dorelia (Augustus John's mistress).

An art mystery novel The Gwen John Sculpture, by John Malcolm, features her stay in Meudon, France and her relationship with Rodin.

An S4C documentary presented by Ffion Hague about Gwen John's life included filming of the unveiling of a memorial plaque to the artist in Dieppe's Janval Cemetery in 2015.

Margaret Forster wrote a novel, published 2006, Keeping the World Away, centred upon a picture by John, A Corner of the Artist's Room in Paris, which starts with the story of John herself and then follows stories of fictional women who subsequently owned it and responded to it. The title comes from something written by John: "Rules to Keep the World away: Do not listen to people (more than is necessary); Do not look at people (ditto); Have as little intercourse with people as possible; When you come into contact with people, talk as little a possible ..."

John was the aunt of the cellist Amaryllis Fleming, her brother's illegitimate daughter with his other mistress Evelyn Fleming, whose husband Valentine was a Member of Parliament and died in the First World War. Through Amaryllis, John was a great-aunt to Evelyn's granddaughter, the actress Lucy Fleming.

Gallery

Notes

References 
 Foster, Alicia, & John, Gwen (1999). Gwen John. British artists. Princeton, NJ: Princeton University Press. .
 Langdale, Cecily, Jenkins, David F., & John, Gwen (1986). Gwen John (1876–1939): An Interior Life. New York: Rizzoli. .
 Langdale, Cecily (1987). Gwen John. New Haven and London: Yale University Press. .
 Schwartz, Sanford (2001). "To Be a Pilgrim", The New York Review of Books, November 29, 2001: pp. 36–38.
 Tamboukou, Maria. (2010). Nomadic Narratives, Visual Forces: Gwen John's Letters and Paintings. Peter Lang. .
 Uglow, Jennifer S.; Frances Hinton; Maggy Hendry (1999). The Northeastern Dictionary of Women's Biography. UPNE. .

External links

 
 Gwen John's Cats
 Tate Gallery collection of John's works
 BBC Wales profile
 Article at Swansea Heritage site
 Welsh Heroes
 "Gwen John's forgotten scholar": Michael Holroyd's reminiscence about a fellow biographer and scholar, from TLS, October 22, 2008.

1876 births
1939 deaths
19th-century Welsh painters
19th-century Welsh women artists
20th-century Welsh painters
20th-century Welsh women artists
Académie Carmen alumni
Bisexual painters
Bisexual women
British artists' models
Converts to Roman Catholicism
John family
Welsh LGBT painters
Welsh bisexual people
LGBT Roman Catholics
People from Haverfordwest
Sibling artists
Welsh expatriates in France
Welsh portrait painters
Welsh Roman Catholics
Welsh watercolourists
Welsh women painters
Women watercolorists